Sobralia dichotoma, is a species of orchid native to Colombia, Ecuador, Peru and Bolivia.

References 

dichotoma
Orchids of South America
Orchids of Venezuela
Flora of Peru

Terrestrial orchids